Csongor és Tünde is a Hungarian play, written by Mihály Vörösmarty. It was first produced in 1830.

Hungarian plays
1830 plays